Ukhimath (also spelled Okhimath) is a small town and a Hindu pilgrimage site in Rudraprayag district, Uttarakhand in India.  It is situated at an elevation of 1,311 meters and at a distance of 41 km from Rudraprayag. During the winter, the Utsava Idols from the Kedarnath Temple, and Madhyamaheshwar Temple are brought to Ukhimath and worshipped here for six months. Ukhimath can be used as center destination for visiting different places located nearby, the Madhyamaheshwar Temple, Tungnath Temple and Deoria Tal (a natural fresh water lake) and many other picturesque places. According to Hindu Mythology, the wedding of Usha (Daughter of Banasura) and Aniruddha (Grandson of Lord Krishna) was solemnized here. By name of Usha this place was named as Ushamath, now known as Ukhimath. King Mandhata had performed severe penances to Lord Shiva here. During the winter, the Kedarnath and Madhyamaheshwar Temples are closed due to heavy snowfall in the area. As a result, the Utsava Idols of Kedarnath and Madhyamaheshwar are brought from Kedarnath and Madhyamaheshwar to the Omkareshwar Temple in Ukhimath. The winter puja of Kedarnath and Omkareshwar (the presiding deity of Ukhimath) is performed here. The Omkareshwar Temple is located at Ukhimath, which is at a distance of 41 km from Rudraprayag.

Ukhimath has many other ancient temples dedicated to several Gods and Goddesses such as Usha, Shiva, Aniruddha, Parvati and Mandhata. Situated on the road connecting Guptakashi with Gopeshwar, the holy town is mainly inhabited by the head priests of Kedarnath known as Rawals who move here to spend the winter.

Ukhimath has an All India Radio Relay station known as Akashvani Ukhimath. It broadcasts on FM frequencies.

Gallery

See also
 Panch Kedar
 Kedarnath
 Chota Char Dham
 Char Dham
 Jyotirlinga

References 

Hindu temples in Uttarakhand
Hindu pilgrimage sites in India
Rudraprayag district